Tankcsapda discography is summarised to the right, with some albums listed below

Albums 

Discographies of Hungarian artists